Ivica Blagojević (born January 19, 1974) is a Macedonian-Serbian former professional basketball player who last played for Kumanovo.

References

External links
 Basketball.eurobasket.com
 Fiba.com
 Tromostorm.no

1974 births
Living people
BC Prievidza players
KK MZT Skopje players
KK Radnički Kragujevac (1950–2004) players
Macedonian expatriate sportspeople in Norway
Macedonian expatriate basketball people in Serbia
Macedonian men's basketball players
Macedonian people of Serbian descent
KK Lions/Swisslion Vršac players
Centers (basketball)